The 1996–97 Courage League Division 4 South was the tenth full season of rugby union within the fourth tier of the English league system, currently known as National League 2 South, and the last using the name Division 4 South.  Changes to the league structure by the RFU at the start of the season saw Courage League 4 revert to two regional divisions (Courage League Division 4 North and Courage League Division 4 South), while the regional leagues below (Courage League Division 5) was split back into regional leagues - North 1, Midlands 1, London 1 and South West 1.  This meant that National Division 4 South increased from 10 to 14 teams (28 overall) with multiple teams coming up from the discontinued Division 5.

At the end of the season, Newbury were deserving champions, winning 25 league games that they played (one match was cancelled) and claiming the only promotion spot to the 1997–98 National Division 1 (formerly Courage Division 3), 10 points clear of their nearest challengers, Henley.  At the other end of the table, four teams were relegated.  Askeans and Charlton Park were comfortably the worst teams in the division and were the first two sides to go down, followed by High Wycombe and then Berry Hill, with Berry Hill putting up the most fight and finishing just one point from safety.   Askeans and Charlton Park would drop to London Division 1 while High Wycombe and Berry Hill would fall to South West 1.  The reason Division 4 South had so many relegation places compared to Division 4 North (4 to 2) was that 3 out of 4 of the teams relegated from the division above were based in the south of the country, requiring more places to accommodate for their arrival the following season.

Structure

Each team played home and away matches against each of the other teams, playing a total of twenty-six matches each. The league champions were promoted to the new-look National League 1 while the bottom four sides dropped to either London 1 or South West 1 depending on locality.

Participating teams and locations

League table

Sponsorship
Courage League Division 4 South is part of the Courage Clubs Championship and is sponsored by Courage Brewery.  This was their tenth and final season of sponsorship.

Notes

References

N4
National League 2 South